Nile Breweries FC, or Nile Breweries, is a Ugandan football club from Jinja, Uganda.

They play in the Second division of Ugandan football, the Ugandan Big League. In 1980 the team won the Ugandan Super League.

Honours
Ugandan Super League: 1980

Performance in CAF competitions
1981 African Cup of Champions Clubs

References

External links

Football clubs in Uganda
Works association football teams